Dunkirk Lighthouse ( or Phare de Risban) is an automated first order (i.e. 60 km beam or further) port lighthouse, the highest of this type in France. It is sited near Dunkirk. Construction of the lighthouse was completed in 1843.

See also 

 List of lighthouses in France

References

External links 

 

Lighthouses completed in 1842
Lighthouse
Lighthouses in France
Lighthouses of the English Channel
Monuments historiques of Nord (French department)
Tourist attractions in Nord (French department)
Transport in Hauts-de-France
1842 establishments in France